Phil Taylor may refer to:

Phil Taylor (musician) (1954–2015), English drummer, best known as "Philthy Animal" Taylor
Phil Taylor (darts player) (born 1960), English darts player
Phil Taylor (American football) (born 1988), American football player
Phil Taylor (footballer, born 1917) (1917–2012), English professional footballer and manager (Liverpool FC)
Phil Taylor (footballer, born 1958), English professional footballer (York City, Darlington FC)
Phil Taylor (rugby union) (born 1931), English rugby union player
Philip Meadows Taylor (1808–1876), Anglo-Indian administrator and novelist